Digital Fuel is a provider of IT financial management SaaS software for planning, billing. The company's headquarters is in Los Angeles, California.

History
Digital Fuel was co-founded in 2000 by Benny Lehmann, Israel Dancziger, Gilad Raz and Yakov Kogan who served as the company's CEO, CTO, and vice president of engineering, respectively. Digital Fuel's ServiceFlow software was originally sold to corporate IT teams and to service providers to help them manage service level agreements (SLAs) for outsourcing agreements.

In 2008 Digital Fuel expanded its product line to include IT financial management tools, to help corporate IT manage the business value and cost of IT and gain better insight into IT costs.

Digital Fuel has raised over $30m in funding from investors including Apax Partners, Benchmark Capital, Israel Seed Partners, and Sigma Partners.

In June 2011, VMware purchased Digital Fuel for $85 million.

In September 2016, Skyview Capital acquired Digital Fuel from VMware.

In February 2018, Apptio, Inc. acquired Digital Fuel from Skyview Capital.

See also
 VMware
 IT cost transparency
 IT service management

References 

Online financial services companies of the United States
Information technology management
Software companies based in California
Companies based in San Mateo, California
Software companies established in 2000
2000 establishments in California
Software companies of Israel
Defunct software companies of the United States
2000 establishments in the United States
American companies established in 2000